George Mihail Pruteanu (15 December 1947 – 27 March 2008) was a Romanian literary critic and politician.

He was born in Bucharest in 1947. His father, was a Jewish medical doctor and a university professor who studied the history of Moldavian medicine. His mother, Sofia Pruteanu, was an office worker.  When he was 4 years old his parents divorced and he took his mother's maiden name.

George Pruteanu studied literature at the University of Iași and the University of Bucharest. Starting in 1972, he wrote various columns for literary magazines such as Convorbiri Literare, Contemporanul, and Cronica. After the 1989 Revolution, he continued his work as journalist for newspapers such as Expres and Evenimentul Zilei. Between 1995 and 1999, he was also the host of a 5-minute daily TV programme on correct usage of the Romanian language ("Doar o vorbă săț-i mai spun", a title containing a deliberate, provocative mistake), which was broadcast first by Tele7ABC (1995), then ProTV (1995–1996), TVR1 (1997–1999), and again TVR1 (2006–2008).

In 1996, Pruteanu was elected to the Romanian Senate as a Constanța County Senator on a Christian Democratic National Peasants' Party ticket, but resigned in 1998. In 2000, he was elected once again, this time in Bistrița-Năsăud County as a member of the Social Democratic Party (PSD). In 2003, he resigned from PSD and joined the Greater Romania Party (PRM), running for the Senate in Suceava County in 2004.

Pruteanu introduced a bill in 1997, which became known as the "Pruteanu Bill", requiring all public notices (including ads) in foreign languages to have Romanian translations. A trimmed-down version of this bill was promulgated by President Ion Iliescu in 2004. Pruteanu was also critical of the Romanian entertainment industry, especially of low-quality TV programmes and manele, which he called "intellectual manure".

He died in Bucharest after suffering a heart attack on 27 March 2008. He is buried at Bellu Cemetery.

Works
Petru Dumitriu: Pactul cu diavolul (1995)
Partidul și partida – atitudini politice (2000) 
Cronica unei mari dezamăgiri – O istorie mediatică (2000) 
Feldeința călinesciană – studiu monografic (2001) 
Elemente esențiale de tehnică mediatică (2002) 
 Translation of Dante Alighieri's The Divine Comedy into Romanian

References
  Literary critics about George Pruteanu
  Adevărul, 19 November 2004. Legea "Pruteanu" intră in vigoare la 17 decembrie
  Gardianul, 27 September 2003. George Pruteanu: Pentru că țin cu lefegiii, m-am înscris in Partidul România Mare
  Ziarul Tricolorul, 19 November 2004. Echipa lui Vadim - George Pruteanu
Curriculum Vitae on his personal site  (accessed 6 December 2005)

External links
pruteanu.ro: George Pruteanu's official site (includes his translation of The Divine Comedy)

1947 births
2008 deaths
Greater Romania Party politicians
Christian Democratic National Peasants' Party politicians
Social Democratic Party (Romania) politicians
Politicians from Bucharest
Romanian essayists
Journalists from Bucharest
Romanian literary critics
Members of the Senate of Romania
Romanian translators
Grammarians from Romania
University of Bucharest alumni
Academic staff of the University of Bucharest
20th-century translators
20th-century essayists
Alexandru Ioan Cuza University alumni
Burials at Bellu Cemetery
20th-century journalists
Jewish Romanian politicians
Jewish Romanian writers